Events in the year 1996 in Ukraine.

Incumbents
President: Leonid Kuchma
Prime Minister: Yevhen Marchuk (until 28 May), Pavlo Lazarenko (starting 28 May)

Events
June 28 - first celebration of Constitution Day (Ukraine)

Births

Deaths
January 22 - Petro Shelest, politician
November 10 - Imam Alimsultanov, Chechen folk singer
November 25 - Mykhailo Krechko, composer
Hryhory Nazarenko, musician

References

 
1990s in Ukraine
Years of the 20th century in Ukraine
Ukraine
Ukraine